Judi Jane Conway Patton  (born 1940 in Pikeville, Kentucky) is an American activist for women's safety and child abuse prevention. She served as the First Lady of Kentucky from December 12, 1995, until December 9, 2003, during the tenure of her husband, former Governor Paul E. Patton.

Early life 
Patton was born in Pike County, Kentucky as one of four daughters born to Roy and Esta Conway.

Roy Conway was a businessman and former state legislator who had been elected as sheriff "on a platform to clean out bootleggers and stop corruption that spoiled the reputation of our beautiful mountain town". Conway was assassinated by bootleggers, Tommy and Hubert Vanover, in front of his family home on July 28, 1950, at the age of 44. Esta Conway was originally from the Craft and Wright families of Letcher County, Kentucky and attended Morehead State Teacher's College. She continued her husband's work for the remainder of his term. Esta Conway was the first female sheriff in the town, but was defeated as she ran for a special election to complete her husband's former term.

After her father's death, the Conway family opened a small grocery store, where the children were expected to work part-time. Mrs. Conway offered credit to women and families in need.  Even after the grocery store closed down, due to lack of income, Mrs. Conway did not attempt to collect from the families. While completing college, Mrs. Conway would welcome women and families into their home in order to offer comfort for those in need. In a 2002 interview, Judi Patton expressed how important these actions were in rescuing women from danger and creating meaningful connections among women in the town: "Many times she would bring women and children home. Mama had this great networking system in Pikeville -- the women she got a job, the kids she put in school. ... Almost until Mama passed away, she was getting letters from women saying they would have been lost if she wasn't there to get them out. So, I thought, if I could do anything to make her proud of me, I would carry on her work."  Esta Conway died on April 29, 1991, at the age of 78; she was a proponent in shaping her daughter Judi's activism.

In her early years, Patton was constantly at home with her mother caring for and nurturing the women her mother brought home to their eastern Kentucky home during the Appalachian War on Poverty.

Personal life
After graduating from Pikeville College, Judi married coal operator Bill Harvey Johnson in 1965 and had two children. They had two grandchildren; their only granddaughter died on Christmas Day 2005 from meningitis. Two years after they divorced in 1973, her ex-husband was murdered in a robbery.

In 1977, Judi Jane Conway wed Paul E. Patton, who was also from Pike County. Both had been married once before, but found each other when Judi was working as a secretary at Kentucky Elkhorn Coal Mine, which Paul owned. She ran a garden and landscaping business in Pike County, and was active in the Democratic Women's Club, the Pike County Junior Women's Club and chaired the Pike County Cancer Society.  In 1984 she served as a delegate to the Democratic National Convention. Judi and Paul Patton both agreed with the principles and policies of the Democratic Party, which they carried with them through their political careers in Kentucky.

Activist work

In December 1995, Judi and her husband Paul Patton (59th Governor of Kentucky) entered the Governor's Office in Frankfort, Kentucky. Immediately, Judi focused on taboo topics such as child abuse and domestic violence.

While in office in Frankfort, Kentucky, she pushed "20 bills that strengthened protections for children, domestic violence and sexual assault survivors, created policy standards for prosecuting perpetrators and expanded training initiatives from local law enforcement to judges, doctors and nurses."  In 1994 the federal Violence Against Women Act passed, and in 1996 Patton received from Janet Reno the federal government's allotted grant funding for the Commonwealth to address the needs of domestic violence and sexual assault victims. Two years later, Vice-President Al Gore presented to Patton a special "full faith and credit" grant of nearly $3 million from the STOP Violence Against Women program from the U.S. Department of Justice. Kentucky has 11 advocacy centers in the state's Area Development Districts due to Patton's work.

Patton's work concerning women and children continues. Other leadership roles Patton took on were:

 Helping create the Governor's Task Force on Sexual Assault, which proposed legislation creating and funding Rape Crisis Centers around the state, removing legal restrictions on marital rape victims, toughening sexual offender laws and creating victim protections.
 Backing legislation that created Family Courts in Kentucky.
 Promoting legislation that forced insurance companies to cover the cost of breast reconstruction and equalization for cancer patients.
 Becoming the first governor's wife to serve on the Kentucky Commission on Women.
 Hosting an annual reception for survivors of breast cancer and helping create the Kentucky Breast Cancer Coalition.
 Lobbying lawmakers to pass legislation addressing child abuse, rape, domestic violence and child support.

The only bill with which Patton's lobbying did not succeed was the criminalization of sexual assault between spouses.

In 2002, the Kentucky Commission on Women hosted a conference to discuss a report on the Economic Status of Kentucky's Women. Governor Patton had formed a task force in November 2001 after a national survey ranked Kentucky as the third worst state for women. Patton and former Governor Martha Layne Collins served as co-chairs of the task force and produced a report that evidenced Kentucky's failing rankings in health and nutrition, educational attainment, equity in pay and education, economic sufficiency and political and business leadership.

In 2001, Judi's Place for Kids opened in Pikeville - a center named in her honor. Patton is on the Board of Directors of the Big Sandy Area Child Advocacy Center, founded in 1999 to serve the five easternmost counties of Kentucky (Pike, Floyd, Johnson, Magoffin, Martin), in supporting and protecting child abuse survivors.

In 2003, The Judi Conway Patton Endowed Chair of Study on Violence Against Women was established at the University of Kentucky Center for Research on Violence Against Women.

The Judi Patton Center for Families opened in 2021 as a center to provide resources and treatment to women dealing with substance use disorder.

Awards and honors

Patton received over twenty awards between 1996 and 2001 for her work.
 1996, awarded by the National Center for Missing and Exploited Children.
 1996: Outstanding Legislative Advocacy award; the Kentucky Coalition against Rape and Sexual Assault.
 1996: Kentucky Distinguished Citizen Award; the Kentucky Psychological Association
 1996, received her second national recognition at the 11th National Conference on Child Abuse and Neglect where she received a Commissioner's Award from the U.S. Department of Health and Human Services.
 1996: Inaugural Committed to Peace in Kentucky Homes Award; Kentucky Domestic Violence Association.
 1997: Outstanding Leadership award; the Commonwealth's Attorneys' Association.
 1997: Inaugural Outstanding Advocate Award; Kentucky Council on Child Abuse.
 1997: she was honored by the Lexington YWCA with the Smith-Breckinridge Award for outstanding leadership in support of women and children.
 1997: Distinguished Alumna Award; Pikeville High School.
 1998: she was honored by Board of Directors of Very Special Arts Kentucky for support of Arts Opportunities for Persons with Disabilities.
 1998: Outstanding Service to Children; Kentucky Council for Exceptional Children, Chapter 5.
 1998: Junior Williamson Memorial Award; Pike County Chamber of Commerce
 1999: Friend of Kentucky's Children Award; Exploited Children's Help Organization.
 1999: Honorary degree of Doctor of Humane Letters (L.H.D.); board of directors of Pikeville College.
 1999: Children First honored her with a special award for her outstanding leadership in advocating for children.
 2000: Joy of Life Award; the Kentucky Cancer Program, the Brown Cancer Center
 2000: Leadership Award; Susan G. Komen Breast Cancer Foundation and BMW Ultimate Drive for the Cure.
 2000: Outstanding Child Advocate Award; Sunshine Center in Frankfort, Kentucky, where a children's playroom was also dedicated in her honor.
 2000: Gold Medal Award; Family Place in Louisville for her work on behalf of abused children.
 2000: Annual Leadership Award; Center for Women and Families in Louisville.
 2000: she again was honored by the Kentucky Commonwealth's Attorney's Association in recognition of the successful legislative package she championed before the 2000 Session of the Kentucky General Assembly.
 2001: the Barren River Area Child Advocacy Center honored her for her efforts on behalf of Kentucky's children by establishing the Judi C. Patton Community Conference Hall in the newly constructed advocacy center.
 2001: she was presented the Key to the city by the Mayor Sandy Jones of Bowling Green who was joined by Warren County Judge Executive Mike Buchanon who presented a joint proclamation declaring January 12, 2001, as Children's Advocacy Day in honor of the First Lady.
 2010: Woman of Distinction at the Celebration of Service and Survival based Center for Women and Families
 2023: Flame of Excellence Award; Leadership Kentucky

References

Living people
First Ladies and Gentlemen of Kentucky
People from Magoffin County, Kentucky
University of Pikeville alumni
1940 births
Activists from Kentucky